Irene Viaene (born 7 December 1949) is an Argentine alpine skier. She competed in two events at the 1968 Winter Olympics.

References

External links
 

1949 births
Living people
Argentine female alpine skiers
Olympic alpine skiers of Argentina
Alpine skiers at the 1968 Winter Olympics
People from Ituzaingó, Corrientes
Sportspeople from Corrientes Province